The Packwood Airport is a single runway, public general aviation airport, 3 blocks west of US Highway 12 in downtown Packwood, Washington. No commercial service uses the airport, and flight operations are predominantly private, with search-and-rescue and wildfire control operations in the Gifford Pinchot National Forest and Mount Rainier National Park a significant secondary usage.  Due to the presence of nearby trees and hillsides to the north of the airport, current plans for the airport are to remove the northern , and add at least a corresponding length to the south end of the runway.  It is one of four airports owned and operated by Lewis County, Washington.

References

Airports in Washington (state)
Transportation buildings and structures in Lewis County, Washington